The Flying Fontaines is a 1959 American film about trapeze artists. It stars Michael Callan.

Plot

Cast

Michael Callan as Rick Rias
Evy Norlund as Suzanne Fontaine
Joan Evans as Jan Fontaine
Rian Garrick as Bill Rand
Joe De Santis as Roberto Rias
Roger Perry as Paul Fontaine
Jeanne Manet as Michele Fontaine
John Van Dreelen as Victor Fontaine
Barbara Kelley as Margie

Veteran actor Pierre Watkin appears uncredited in his last film role as a doctor.

Production
The film was originally known as High Trap. Filming started 20 April 1959. The sets were designed by the veteran art director Paul Palmentola, his last film credit.

References

External links

Review of film at New York Times

1959 films
Columbia Pictures films
American drama films
1959 drama films
1950s English-language films
Films directed by George Sherman
1950s American films